Klaipėda in Lithuania has 60 districts:

In addition there are several neighborhoods which do not have municipal status of city district, see :Kategorija:Klaipėdos miesto teritorijos

Barškiai
Budelkiemis
Dauguliai
Gandrališkės
Gedminai (Klaipėda)
Kopgalis
Mogiliovas (Klaipėda)
Naujakiemis (Klaipėda)
Sportininkai (Klaipėda)
Sudmantai
Virkučiai
Žardė (Klaipėda)

 Baltijos - a district in the southern part of the city. There are residential buildings and malls under construction in the southern part of the district.
 Bandužiai - a district in the southern part of the city. It was built in the 9-10th decade of the 20th century.
 Barškiai -  a district in the eastern part of the city. It is a  thinly populated district that has a bad connection to the city.
 Barškiai - a district in the northern part of the city.
 Debrecenas - a district in the southern part of the city. It was built in the 8-9th decade of the 20th century.
 Eglė - a district in the southern part of the city. It was built in the 8-9th decade of the 20th century.
 Gandrališkės - a district in the southern part of the city. It is a new district  and home to the tallest residential building in the Baltic States - Pilsotas.
 Giruliai - a district in the northern part of the city. It is located near the Baltic sea
 Kauno - a district in the southern part of the city. The biggest mall in Klaipėda Akropolis in this district.
 Kopgalis - a district in the western part of the city. It is located in the Curonian Spit
 Laukininkai - a district in the southern part of the city. It has one of the biggest night clubs in Lithuania, "Kalifornija"
 Lypkiai - a district in the eastern part of the city. It is located in Klaipėda Free Economic Zone.
 Mažasis Kaimelis - a district in the northern part of the city. It has a lot of luxurious private houses and a few apartment houses.
 Melnragė - a district in the northern part of the city. It is connected to the sea. Klaipėda's beach "Melnragė" is located in this district.
 Miško rajonas - a district in the northern part of the city. It is dominated by 5-12 storey apartment buildings
 Naujakiemis - a district in the southern part of the city.
 Pempininkai - a district in the southern part of the city. It is a densely populated district and it was built in the 8-9th decade of the 20th century.
 Rimkai - a district in the south-eastern part of the city.
 Sendvaris - a district in the eastern part of the city.
 Smeltė - a district in the southern part of the city, near the Curonian Lagoon
 Smiltynė - a district in the western part of the city. It is located in the Curonian Spit in south of Kopgalio district.
 Sportininkų - a district in the northern part of the city. It is the home to the biggest football stadium in Klaipėda, Žalgiris Stadium
 Sudmantai - a district in the eastern part of the city. It is a thinly populated district.
 Tauralaukis - a district in the northern part of the city.
 Trinyčiai - a district in the eastern part of the city.
 Virkučiai - a district in the northern part of the city.
 Šauliai - a district in the eastern part of the city.
 Švyturio - a district in the northern part of the city. It is located in harbour territory.
 Žardė - a district in the southern part of the city. It was built in the 8-9th decade of the 20th century.
 Žvejybos uostas - a district in the southern part of the city. The neighbourhood has one of the highest crime rates in Klaipėda.

References 

Neighbourhoods in Lithuania